The 108th Massachusetts General Court, consisting of the Massachusetts Senate and the Massachusetts House of Representatives, met in 1887 during the governorship of Oliver Ames. Halsey J. Boardman served as president of the Senate and Charles J. Noyes served as speaker of the House.

Senators

Representatives

 William Oscar Armstrong

See also
 50th United States Congress
 List of Massachusetts General Courts

References

Further reading

External links
 
 

Political history of Massachusetts
Massachusetts legislative sessions
massachusetts
1887 in Massachusetts